Concepcion, officially the Municipality of Concepcion (Asi: Banwa it Concepcion, Filipino: Bayan ng Concepcion), is a 6th class municipality in the province of Romblon, Philippines. Located in the island of Maestro de Campo. According to the 2020 census, it has a population of 3,561 people.

History

Early history
Concepcion started as a small village founded in 1570 by the Spanish colonization forces led by Martin de Goiti and Juan de Salcedo, upon orders from then Spanish Governor-General of the Philippines, Miguel Lopez de Legazpi. The village was named after the Immaculate Concepcion. Throughout the Spanish era, the village was administered as part of Banton municipality on nearby Banton Island.

On July 2, 1907, during the American colonization of the Philippines, Concepcion was elevated to municipal status but was incorporated as part of Mindoro province after Romblon was abolished and incorporated as part of Capiz province. However, on March 10, 1917, Romblon was reinstated as a separate province, and thus, Concepcion was incorporated back to the province.

On June 8, 1940, the special municipality of Maghali was established upon passage of Commonwealth Act No. 581 (authored by Congressman Leonardo Festin). This demoted Concepcion and Corcuera from their municipality status and incorporated into the new municipality with its capital in Banton. The special municipality was abolished through the passage of Republic Act No. 38 (authored by Congressman Modesto Formilleza), and by October 1, 1946, Concepcion regained its municipal status which it still holds today.

Proposed secession
Among the islands of Romblon, Concepcion is the farthest from the provincial capital. It is also far from the nearest commercial capital, Odiongan. It takes five hours to travel between Concepcion and Romblon thus making it difficult for provincial executives to visit the island municipality. The nearest municipality from Concepcion is Pinamalayan, Oriental Mindoro, which is only two hours by boat. Hence, most Sibalenhons buy and sell their products in this town instead of Odiongan or Romblon.

In the past, there have been attempts to secede Concepcion from Romblon and re-annex it to Oriental Mindoro. On March 16, 1924, Act No. 3131 was introduced in Congress seeking to re-annex the municipality to Oriental Mindoro but it didn't push through. More recently, in 2014, town mayor Lemuel Cipriano expressed that "90% of Concepcion's 4,500 population are seeking to be re-annexed to Oriental Mindoro". In order to be re-annexed, a resolution calling for a referendum in the island must be filed in Congress by the provincial representative. Oriental Mindoro governor Alfonso Umali Jr. and Second District Congressman Reynaldo Umali have expressed support for a possible referendum.

Geography
The island is mountainous with steep shores. Its settlements are dispersed along the coast with the poblacion on the south shore. The island's interior is jagged and forested, with caves, clear rivers, unique rock formations, and hills that offer extensive views. Every village has its own cove and white sand beaches which are used for swimming and scuba diving.

Climate

Barangays
Concepcion is politically subdivided into 9 barangays.

Demographics

According to the 2015 census, it has a population of 4,037 people. Majority of its inhabitants speak the local dialect, Asi, which is also spoken in the nearby islands of Banton and Simara. Sibalenhons, as the islanders call themselves, are predominantly Roman Catholic with a small percentage of Protestants, Jehovah's Witnesses, and Iglesia ni Cristo.

Economy

Government

Pursuant to Chapter II, Title II, Book III of Republic Act 7160 or the Local Government Code of 1991, the municipal government is composed of a mayor (alkalde), a vice vayor (bise alkalde) and members (kagawad) of the legislative branch Sangguniang Bayan alongside a secretary to the said legislature, all of which are elected to a three-year term and are eligible to run for three consecutive terms. As of June 30, 2019, Concepcion's incumbent mayor is Medrito "Jun" Fabreag, Jr. while his vice mayor is Monico "Nonoy" Firmalan, Jr. Both are from the PDP–Laban political party.

The barangays or villages, meanwhile, are headed by elected officials, the topmost being the Punong Barangay or the Barangay Chairperson (addressed as Kapitan; also known as the Barangay Captain). The Kapitan is aided by the Sangguniang Barangay (Barangay Council) whose members, called Barangay Kagawad (Councilors), are also elected.

Tourism
The mountains and the forest offer mountain trekkers new challenges. The beaches have diving spots. Tropical coral reef systems surround the island. Some old folk believe they share the forest and coves with enchanted beings.

Each of the island's nine barangays has its own cove with a palm-fringed white sand beach front. The entire island is visited for its swimming and scuba diving. Notable beaches include those along Tongo point and the beaches between barangay (village) Bachawan and Sampong. The island's interior hills, stretching five to nine kilometer, have trails for hiking and climbing. The island hills are also commonly visited by motor-cross biking enthusiasts. Other places of interest in the island include:

Mount Banderahan: American soldiers in the early 20th century climbed the island's mountain and planted an American flag. The flagpole, hewed in a big stone, is a landmark sought out by mountain climbers.
Tinigban Falls: The fall site is a rock formation amid lush greenery. An Old Spanish encomendero once built a mansion here, embedding a mirror into a huge rock so he could have a full view of the waterfalls from his bathroom.
Matudtod Cave: Ancient skeletal remains and artifacts were found in this cave.
Quebrada Beach: Quebrada beach facing the town of Concepcion, scalloping the cove with its white sand and wonderful rock formation.

References

External links
Concepcion Profile at PhilAtlas.com
Concepcion, Romblon Profile - Cities and Municipalities Competitive Index
[ Philippine Standard Geographic Code]
Philippine Census Information
Local Governance Performance Management System

Municipalities of Romblon
Beaches of the Philippines
Island municipalities in the Philippines